The Bavarian Mountain Hound (German: Bayerischer Gebirgsschweißhund) is a breed of dog from Germany. As a scent hound, it has been used in Germany since the early 20th century to trail wounded game. It is a cross between the Bavarian Hound and the Hanover Hound.

Appearance

The Bavarian Mountain Hound's head is strong and elongated. The skull is relatively broad and slightly domed. It has a pronounced stop and a slightly curved nosebridge. The muzzle should be broad with solid jaws, and its lips fully covering the mouth. Its nose is black or dark red with wide nostrils. Its ears are high set and medium in length. They are broader at the base and rounded at the tips, hanging heavily against the head. Its body is slightly longer than it is tall and slightly raised at the rump. The neck medium in length, strong, with a slight dewlap. Topline sloping slightly upward from withers to hindquarters. Chest well-developed, long, moderately wide, and well let-down with a slight tuck-up. It has a long, fairly straight croup and solid back. While its tail is set on high, medium in length and hanging to the hock, carried level to the ground or hanging down.

Size

Coat and color

The coat is short, thick and shiny, lying very flat against the body, and moderately harsh. It is finer on the head and ears, harsher and longer on the abdomen, legs, and tail. Its coat can come in all shades of black-masked fawn or brindle.

Temperament
Bavarian Mountain Hounds are calm, poised, and very attached to their masters and family. When hunting, they are hard, single-minded, and persistent, courageous, spirited, fast, and agile, they are at ease on a rugged terrain, with a superb nose and powerful hunting instinct. However, they need a patient, experienced trainer. Friendly and playful, they have great personalities.

Care
The Bavarian Mountain is not suited for city life. It is in regular need of space and exercise and also requires regular brushing. They are not dogs for the casual hunter. Most are owned and used by foresters and game wardens.

History
The Bavarian Mountain Dog was developed in the 19th century by crossbreeding specimens of the Hannoversche Schweißhund breed and hunting dogs from the Alps. The result was a hunting dog ideal for the work in the mountains. In 1912, the "Klub für Bayrische Gebirgsschweißhunde", (Club for Bavarian Mountain hound), was founded in Munich. Afterwards, this breed started gaining popularity in Austria and Hungary. The Bavarian Mountain Dog specialises in tracking injured big game following the traces of blood the prey loses after being shot.

See also
 Dogs portal
 List of dog breeds

References

FCI breeds
Dog breeds originating in Germany
Scent hounds